HSwMS Artemis is a signals intelligence gathering vessel currently being constructed for the Swedish Navy.

The ship is to replace Sweden's only signals intelligence vessel, which was launched in 1984. The ship was ordered on 10 April 2017 and was laid down on 19 June 2018 at the Polish shipyard Nauta. The ship was launched on 17 April 2019 and will be transferred to Karlskrona, Sweden where it will be outfitted. The vessel was expected to be commissioned in 2020.
The project was delayed in March 2021 because the Polish shipyard had economic difficulties and was unable to finish the ship. Granted a reorganization, no work had been performed on the ship since April 2021. The Swedish FMV and Saab are trying to solve the problem according to the Swedish minister of defence.

References

 

2019 ships
Auxiliary ships of the Swedish Navy